Camden Carriage Servicing Depot is a stabling point located in Camden, Greater London, England. The depot is near what used to be Camden Road station, but it closed down in 1916.

The depot code is CM.

Present 
As of 2019, there is no allocation. It is, instead, a stabling point for London Northwestern Railway Class 319 EMUs and Class 350 Desiros.

References 

Rail transport in London